Alina is a female given name of Greek origin.

Alina may also refer to:

 Alina (film), a 1950 Italian drama film
 Alina (fungi), a genus of fungi in the family Alinaceae
 Alina (malware), a malware family targeting point-of-sale systems
 Alina (moth), a genus of moths in the subfamily Lymantriinae
 Alina (novel), a 2006 novel by Jason Johnson
 Alina people, a people mentioned in the Rigveda

See also
 ALINA, a lunar landing vehicle
 Alena (disambiguation)